Amazon Theater was a banner under which a suite of five promotional short films was presented via the front page of Amazon.com in 2004. The shorts were commissioned by Amazon, sponsored by Chase Bank, and produced by Ridley and Tony Scott's television commercials company Ridley Scott Associates (RSA). The unifying theme of the shorts was "karma," and each short featured various consumer items that could be purchased via clickable links to the relevant pages on Amazon.com.

The films

References

External links

Amazon (company)
Advertising campaigns